Enteng Kabisote: OK Ka Fairy Ko... The Legend is a 2004 Filipino fantasy comedy film directed by Tony Y. Reyes, the first installment of Enteng Kabisote film series and the third movie installment based on television sitcom, Okay Ka, Fairy Ko!, which made about PhP 83.6 million. It is also one of the films featured in the 2004 Metro Manila Film Festival.

Plot
Enteng Kabisote (Vic Sotto) is a man married to Faye (Kristine Hermosa), a lovely fairy and the only daughter of Ina Magenta (Giselle Toengi), queen of Engkantasya, an enchanted kingdom. The couple has two children, Aiza (Aiza Seguerra) and Benok (Oyo Boy Sotto). The family is living peacefully and happily until the day Satana (Bing Loyzaga), the evil queen of Kadiliman brings chaos to Earth by sending Romero (Jeffrey Quizon), Lucy (Nikki Arriola) and Fer (Levi Inacio) to poison the water of the dams. But Venuz (Leila Kuzma) and Aries (Patrick Alvarez), armored fairies sent by Ina Magenta stopped them.

Satana turns her ire to Enteng’s family, and she sends Itim (Michael V.), to spy on Enteng and Faye. But because of the family’s goodness to him, Itim deceived and betrayed Satana. In turn, Satana transforms herself into a young girl named Tanny (Nadine Samonte), who seduces and possesses Benok, but Enteng manages to stop her evil deed in time. Burning with anger, Satana kidnaps Faye. She demands that Ina Magenta surrenders her good powers so she can rule the Earth. Instead, Ina sends Enteng and Benok together with Itim (transformed into a talking flying horse) to fight Satana. After a numerous adventures and comic fights, they manage to rescue Faye.

Cast
Vic Sotto as Enteng Kabisote
Kristine Hermosa as Faye Kabisote 
Giselle Toengi as Ina Magenta
Aiza Seguerra as Aiza Kabisote
Oyo Boy Sotto as Benok Kabisote
Bing Loyzaga as Satana/Tanny
Bayani Casimiro II as Prinsipe K
Joey de Leon as Mulawit/Pugo
Jose Manalo as Jose
Jeffrey Quizon as Romero
Ruby Rodriguez as Amy
Michael V. as Itim/Puti

Accolades

See also
 Okay Ka, Fairy Ko! (film series)

References

External links

"Metro Manila Film Festival:2005"

Enteng Kabisote
2004 films
Philippine fantasy comedy films
2000s fantasy comedy films
M-Zet Productions films
OctoArts Films films
2004 comedy films
Films directed by Tony Y. Reyes